Adrianus "Adri" van Es (28 April 1913 – 6 January 1994) was a Dutch naval officer and vice admiral of the Royal Netherlands Navy.

Decorations

References

External links

Official
  A. (Adri) van Es Parlement & Politiek

1913 births
1994 deaths
Anti-Revolutionary Party politicians
Commanders of the Order of the Netherlands Lion
Officers of the Order of Orange-Nassau
Royal Netherlands Navy admirals
Royal Netherlands Naval College alumni
Royal Netherlands Navy officers
Royal Netherlands Navy personnel of World War II
People from Amersfoort
Military personnel from The Hague
20th-century Dutch military personnel
20th-century Dutch politicians